Middle Island is one of the Hummock Island group in the Falkland Islands. It is near West Falkland, to its west, near the estuary of the Chartres River  in King George Bay It is to the south east of Hummock Island.

It is believed that it was used for grazing for a short time before 1930 but has been not been grazed since then and is free of predators.

References

Islands of the Falkland Islands